Love Duets may refer to:

 Love Duets (Toni Gonzaga and Sam Milby album), 2009
 Love Duets (Stephen Costello and Ailyn Perez album), 2014